Prashant Bansilal Bamb  is an Indian politician and member of the Bharatiya Janata Party. He has been elected thrice as a member of Maharashtra Legislative Assembly from the Gangapur, Maharashtra Assembly constituency.

Positions held 
MLA - Maharashtra Legislative Assembly

Terms in Office

• 2009 – Elected to Maharashtra Legislative Assembly (1st Term)

• 2014 – Re Elected to Maharashtra Legislative Assembly (2nd Term)

• 2019 – Re Elected to Maharashtra Legislative Assembly (3rd Term)

References 

Bharatiya Janata Party politicians from Maharashtra
Maharashtra MLAs 2014–2019
Living people
Place of birth missing (living people)
1972 births